The 2014 Korea National League, also known as the Samsung Life National League 2014 due to the sponsorship of Samsung Life Insurance, was the twelfth season of the Korea National League. Each of the ten clubs played against all other clubs three times in the regular season, and the top four clubs of the regular season qualified for the post-season playoffs.

Teams

Regular season

League table

Positions by matchday

Results

Matches 1–18

Matches 19–27

Championship playoffs

Bracket

First round

Gyeongju KHNP won 6–3 on aggregate.

Semi-final

Hyundai Mipo Dockyard won 3–2 on aggregate.

Final

Hyundai Mipo Dockyard won 3–1 on aggregate.

See also
 2014 in South Korean football
 2014 Korea National League Championship
 2014 Korean FA Cup

References

External links
 Official website

Korea National League seasons